Alexandria Library may refer to:

 Library of Alexandria, one of the largest libraries in ancient history
 Bibliotheca Alexandrina, a modern library in Alexandria, Egypt
 Alexandria Library (Virginia), a library in Alexandria, Virginia
 A book series by Rachel Caine entitled The Great Library